This Way Please is a 1937 American musical comedy directed by Robert Florey and featuring Charles "Buddy" Rogers, a popular singer from the days of vaudeville entertainment.

According to historian Martin Grams, the film was the introduction of Mary Livingstone (Mrs. Jack Benny) and Jim and Marian Jordan (radio's Fibber McGee and Molly). It was also Betty Grable's first motion picture under contract with Paramount Studios.

Plot
Betty Grable plays young Jane Morrow, who applies for the job of a theater usherette, and encounters her matinée idol.  After he takes a liking to her, he arranges for her to audition in front of an audience. Jane is a hit, making her idol less favorable. Jane soon finds herself engaged to another man, so a battle of romantic wits ensues.

Cast 

 Charles "Buddy" Rogers as Brad Morgan
 Betty Grable as Jane Morrow
 Ned Sparks as Inky Wells
 Jim Jordan as Fibber McGee
 Marian Jordan as Molly McGee
 Porter Hall as S.J. Crawford
 Lee Bowman as Stu Randall
 Cecil Cunningham as Miss Eberhardt
 Mary Livingstone as Maxine Barry
 Wally Vernon as Bumps

External links

1937 films
1937 musical comedy films
American musical comedy films
1930s English-language films
American black-and-white films
Films directed by Robert Florey
Paramount Pictures films
1930s American films